Shoranur Junction  is the railway station located at Shoranur, Palakkad District, Kerala. It comes under the Palakkad Railway Division of the Southern Railway. It is the largest railway station in the state of Kerala in terms of area. It is an important junction because it is the point at which the line from Chennai via Jolarpettai, Erode and Palakkad meets the coastal line from Mangalore to Kanyakumari. Further, Shoranur junction is the node from which a separate Branch line goes to the town of Nilambur, about 66 km to the north. The Nilambur–Shoranur line, which connects two tiny hill-towns, is one of the most picturesque in India.

Introduction
The station is situated at the junction of four major railway lines – the Nilambur line from the north, Palakkad line from the east, Kanyakumari line from the south and Mangalore line from the North-west. Being the entry point into the Malabar region from the rest of the state, Shoranur is often referred as the gateway to Malabar. It comes under the Palakkad Railway Division of the Southern Railway. Shoranur is the second railway station in Kerala after Trivandrum Central railway station to introduce Clean train station activity, whereby trains stopping at the station for more than 15 minutes would be subjected to mechanized cleaning and garbage removal. Lifts from platforms has also been proposed. As a pilot project She toilet has also been introduced. A baby care unit was opened in Ladies waiting Hall on PF .2/3

History
The history of Shoranur railway station dates back to the 19th century when the railways first made inroads into Malabar. Tirur railway station was the oldest station in the state. The stations at Tanur, Parappanangadi, and  Vallikkunnu also form parts of the oldest railway line in the state laid from Tirur to Beypore (Kozhikode). The line started functioning on March 12, 1861. In the same year, it was extended from Tirur to Kuttippuram via Tirunavaya. Later, it was further extended from Kuttippuram to Pattambi in 1862, and was again extended from Pattambi to Podanur in the same year. The current Chennai-Mangalore railway line was later formed as an extension of the Beypore - Podanur line thus constructed. The Shoranur Junction Railway Station became operational with the opening of Pattambi–Podanur line on 14 April 1862. The importance of the station increased with the opening of the Shoranur–Eranakulam line in 1902. The final addition to the railway infrastructure of Shoranur came with the opening of Nilambur road line in 1927. The presence of Palakkad Gap makes the accessibility from Southwestern coast of India (Mangalore) to southeastern coast (Chennai) easier.

Layout

There are 7 platforms at the station for handling long and short-distance trains. platforms 1, 2 and 3 mainly handle passenger trains originating from the station, while platforms 4, 5, 6 and 7 cater to long-distance express trains. There is only a single terminal which is located towards the northern side of the station. As part of setting up of automatic signalling system between Ernakulam and Shoranur railway stations, the yard of the station will be remodelled in such a way that all 7 platforms will be able to dispatch and receive trains simultaneously. Palakkad-Shoranur and Thrissur-Shoranur will be double tracks soon.

Location
The station is located on the Shoranur ring road. The Shoranur Municipal Bus Stand located 500 m away, provides bus services to Ottapalam, Thrissur, Pattambi, Cherpulassery, Chelakkara, Mannarkkad, Perinthalmanna and Kunnamkulam. The second Municipal stand at Kulappully, located 2 km from the station, handles bus services to Palakkad, Guruvayur, Ponnani and Valanchery.

Triangular station
There is a long-standing demand for an Island station along the link line that bye passes the Shoranur Junction railway station 1 km to the east. Construction of such a station is expected to help the passengers from Malabar access many long-distance trains that at present passes through the outskirts of station.

Trivia
 Shoranur was visited by Swami Vivekananda in 1892 during his Kerala tour. It is believed that the Banyan tree which stands between platform numbers two and three was planted by him after addressing a public gathering.
 The "Old Cochin bridge" which connected Shoranur to Cheruthuruthy in Thrissur district was the original railway bridge that connected Malabar to The Princely State Of Cochin . With the construction of the current railway bridge, the bridge started to be used exclusively for road transport.

See also
 Shoranur
 Southern Railway Zone (India)
 Indian Railways

References

External links

Railway stations in Palakkad district
Palakkad railway division
Railway stations opened in 1862
Railway junction stations in Kerala
1862 establishments in India